The 2009 Mid-American Conference women's basketball tournament was the post-season basketball tournament for the Mid-American Conference (MAC) 2008–2009 season.  The winner of the tournament received the MAC's automatic bid into the 2009 NCAA Division I women's basketball tournament. Regular season west division winner Ball State won the tournament over east division winner Bowling Green. Tracy Pontius was the tournament MVP.

Format
Each of the 12 women's basketball teams in the MAC receive a berth in the conference tournament.  Teams are seeded per division by conference record with the following tie-breakers: 
 Two-team tie:
 Head-to-head competition
 Division record (ten games)
 Record vs. #1 team in division proceeding through the #6 team, if necessary
 Non-division record (six games)
 Record vs. #1 team in the opposite division proceeding through the #6 team, if necessary
 Coin flip by the Commissioner
 Three-team tie:
 Total won–lost record of games played among the tied teams
 Division record (ten games)
 Record vs. #1 team in division proceeding through the #6 team, if necessary
 Non-division record (six games)
 Record vs. #1 team in the opposite division proceeding through the #6 team, if necessary
 Coin flip by the Commissioner

Note: Once a three-team tie has been reduced to two teams, the two-team tiebreakers go in effect.  If there are multiple ties, the ties are broken from the top down (e.g. a tie for #3 will be broken before a tie for #5).

The top two seeds in each division receive byes into the Quarterfinals. All rounds were held at Quicken Loans Arena.

Bracket

All-Tournament Team
Tournament MVP – Tracy Pontius, Bowling Green

References

Mid-American Conference women's basketball tournament
2008–09 Mid-American Conference women's basketball season
MAC Women's Basketball
Basketball competitions in Cleveland
College basketball tournaments in Ohio
Women's sports in Ohio
2000s in Cleveland